Thomas Gordon Walker  was Dean of Achonry from 1907 until his death on 9 May 1916.

Allen was educated at Trinity College, Dublin. He spent his whole career at Emlaghfad. He was a Canon of Achonry from 1896 until 1907.

References

19th-century births
1916 deaths

Year of birth unknown
Alumni of Trinity College Dublin
Irish Anglicans
Deans of Achonry
People from Ballymena
People educated at Ballymena Academy